A* or A star may refer to:
A* search algorithm, a pathfinding algorithm used in computing
A*, the highest grade in examination systems such as the GCE Advanced Level
A*STAR, the Singapore Agency for Science, Technology and Research
AStar, the Eurocopter AS350 Écureuil helicopter
Class A star, a star of spectral class A
Sagittarius A*, a radio source at the center of the Milky Way, believed to be a supermassive black hole

See also
Astar (disambiguation)